This is a list of the most-viewed Indian music videos on YouTube. "Phonics Song with Two Words" from children's channel ChuChu TV is the most viewed video in India and is the 7th most viewed YouTube video in the world. "Why This Kolaveri Di" become the first Indian music video to cross 100 million views. Dheere Dheere Se by Yo Yo Honey Singh become the first Indian music video to cross 200 million views . "Swag Se Swagat" became the first Indian music video to cross 500 million views on YouTube. "Laung Laachi" became the first Indian song to cross 1 billion views on YouTube. "Humpty the train on a fruits ride" by "Kiddiestv Hindi - Nursery Rhymes & Kids Songs" became the first Hindi video on YouTube to cross 1 billion views on 26 December 2019 and is the most viewed Hindi video on YouTube. "Chotu ke Golgappe" uploaded by "Khandeshi Movies" is the first and only non-musical and non-children video to cross the 1 billion view mark in India and the world. It is also the first and only comedy skit video in India and the world to cross the 1 billion view mark.

As of 24 May 2022, 38 videos have exceeded 1 billion views most song in Indian Hanuman Chalisa 3 billions views in 2023

Top music videos

The following table lists the top 100 most-viewed Indian music videos on YouTube, with each total rounded to the nearest many million-billion views, uploader and upload date.

Legend:B = BillionM = Million

Children's Videos

The following table lists the Indian videos on YouTube with views that are aimed for children.

 Baby Shark="1"  English Pingfong South Korea 32 Billion June 2016

See also 
 Indian pop
 List of most-viewed YouTube videos
 Hindi film music

References 

Lists of YouTube videos
India music-related lists
Indian Youtube videos